The Europe/Africa Zone was one of the three zones of the regional Davis Cup competition in 2000.

In the Europe/Africa Zone there were four different tiers, called groups, in which teams competed against each other to advance to the upper tier. Winners in Group II advanced to the Europe/Africa Zone Group I. Teams who lost their respective ties competed in the relegation play-offs, with winning teams remaining in Group II, whereas teams who lost their play-offs were relegated to the Europe/Africa Zone Group III in 2001.

Participating nations

Draw

 and  promoted to Group I in 2001.

First round

Latvia vs. Croatia

Luxembourg vs. Ireland

Turkey vs. Denmark

Lithuania vs. Ivory Coast

Egypt vs. Slovenia

Poland vs. Estonia

Bulgaria vs. Greece

Norway vs. Israel

Second round

Ireland vs. Croatia

Denmark vs. Ivory Coast

Poland vs. Slovenia

Greece vs. Norway

Relegation play-offs

Luxembourg vs. Latvia

Turkey vs. Lithuania

Estonia vs. Egypt

Bulgaria vs. Israel

Third round

Croatia vs. Ivory Coast

Greece vs. Slovenia

References

External links
Davis Cup official website

Davis Cup Europe/Africa Zone
Europe Africa Zone Group II